The British National Party (BNP) leadership election of 2015 was triggered on 19 July 2014 when Nick Griffin stepped down as BNP leader to instead become the organisation's president (he was later expelled from the party and therefore the presidency in October 2014), but was not announced until 29 June 2015. Two candidates stood in the leadership election: Adam Walker (Acting BNP leader since 2014, and previously Deputy Leader of the BNP) and Paul Hilliard (BNP Derbyshire Sub Regional Organiser). On 27 July 2015, the results of the leadership election were announced, with Walker being named the winner by a margin of 378 votes, which translated to a 55.35% margin of victory. Walker had secured 543 votes compared to the 145 votes for Hilliard and the 15 spoiled ballot papers (which equaled 2.19%).

Candidates 
All candidates required a 150 word write up along with a photograph of the candidate for the postal election address, a further 500 word write up for publication on the BNP website, a 5-minute video election address for publication on the Party website, and were required to attend a series of husting events for voting members in order to appear on the ballot. Two candidates were confirmed:
 Adam Walker, Acting BNP leader since 2014 and previously Deputy Leader of the BNP
 Paul Hilliard, BNP Derbyshire Sub Regional Organiser

Results 
The share of the vote was split 21.23% to Hilliard and 76.58% to Walker. There were 15 spoiled ballot papers.

References

External links 
 Official BNP website
 BNP Leadership Election - Candidate Video - Adam Walker
 BNP Leadership Election - Candidate Video - Paul Hilliard

British National Party leadership
2015
British National Party leadership election
British National Party leadership election